is a passenger railway station located in the city of Iruma, Saitama, Japan, operated by the private railway operator Seibu Railway.

Lines

Station layout
The station consists of a ground-level side platform and two island platforms, serving a total of four tracks.

Platforms

Platform 2 is not normally used.

History

It was renamed Irumashi on 1 April 1967.

Station numbering was introduced on all Seibu Railway lines during fiscal 2012, with Irumashi Station becoming "SI23".

Passenger statistics
In fiscal 2019, the station was the 28th busiest on the Seibu network with an average of 33,713 passengers daily. The passenger figures for previous years are as shown below.

Surrounding area

 
 Iruma City Office
 Sainomori Iruma Park

See also
 List of railway stations in Japan

References

External links

  

Railway stations in Saitama Prefecture
Railway stations in Japan opened in 1915
Seibu Ikebukuro Line
Iruma, Saitama